Lac Baker (meaning "Lake Baker") is a Canadian lake with an area of 6 km2 located in northwestern New Brunswick on the border with Quebec.

The lake drains to the south through Baker Brook into the Saint John River at the community of Baker Brook.

The northern part of the lake stretches  to the northwest, in the municipality of Saint-Jean-de-Lande in Quebec province.

This lake is supplied in term of water from Kitchen Creek (from the West, i.e. from the Quebec). The mouth of the lake is located on the provincial border in the northwest part of the lake.

The lake is surrounded by a road for cottages arranged around it.

Toponymy

The lake derives its name from John Baker, who founded Baker Brook and subsequently discovered the lake.

See also
List of lakes of New Brunswick

References

External links
Norma Kennedy Plourde - Lac Baker 

Baker
Baker
Landforms of Madawaska County, New Brunswick
Borders of New Brunswick
Borders of Quebec